Peter Mwang'ombe was a Kenyan Anglican priest in the second half of the 20th century.

He was educated in Limuru and ordained in 1945. He was Archdeacon of Mombasa from 1955 until 1964 when he was appointed Bishop of Mombasa.

References

Year of birth missing
Year of death missing
Archdeacons of Mombasa
Anglican bishops of Mombasa
Kenyan Anglicans